This is a list of Nigerian films released in 2013.

Films

See also
List of Nigerian films

References

External links
2013 films at the Internet Movie Database

2013
Lists of 2013 films by country or language
Films